John IV may refer to:
 Patriarch John IV of Alexandria, Patriarch between 569 and 579
 John IV of Armenia, Catholicos of Armenia between 833 and 855
 John IV of Constantinople (died 595), Patriarch from 582
 Pope John IV (died 642), Pope from 640
 John IV (bishop of Naples) (died 835)
 John IV of Naples, Duke from 997 to after 1002
 John IV of Gaeta (died 1012)
 John IV of Ohrid, Archbishop of Ohrid in 1139/43–1157/64
 John IV, Count of Soissons (died 1302)
 John IV Laskaris (1250–1305), Emperor of Nicaea from 1259 to 1261
 John IV, Duke of Brittany (1339–1399), Count of Montfort, 7th Earl of Richmond
 John IV, Lord of Arkel (died 1360)
 John IV, Count of Sponheim-Starkenburg (died 1414)
 John IV, Duke of Saxe-Lauenburg (died 1414)
 John IV, Duke of Mecklenburg (died 1422)
 John IV, Count of Katzenelnbogen (died 1444)
 John IV, Count of Armagnac (1396–1450), Count of Armagnac, Fézensac, and Rodez
 John IV, Duke of Brabant (1403–1427)
 John IV of Trebizond (1403–1460), Emperor of Trebizond
 John IV, Count of Nassau-Siegen (1410–1475), Count of Nassau, Vianden and Diez
 John IV, Marquess of Montferrat (1412–1464)
 Jan IV of Oświęcim (1426/1430–1497), Duke of Gliwice
 John IV, Duke of Bavaria (1437–1463)
 John IV, Landgrave of Leuchtenberg (1470–1531)
 John IV, Duke of Krnov (died 1483), Duke of Wodzisław Śląski
 John IV of Chalon-Arlay (1443–1502), prince of Orange
 Ivan IV of Russia (Ivan the Terrible, 1530–1584)
 John IV, Count of Nassau-Idstein (1603–1677)
 John IV of Portugal (1604–1656), known as John II, Duke of Braganza, before 1640
 John IV of Ethiopia (1837–1889)
 Jean, Count of Paris (born 1965), Orléanist pretender to the French throne as Jean IV

See also
John 4, the fourth chapter of the Gospel of John
John Ernest IV, Duke of Saxe-Coburg-Saalfeld (1658–1729)
Ioannes IV (disambiguation)
Johann IV (disambiguation)

John 04